Nora Krug (born 1977) is a German–American author and illustrator. Her graphic novel Belonging: A German Reckons With History and Home won the 2018 National Book Critics Circle Award in Autobiography, 2019 Schubart-Literaturpreis, and 2019 Evangelischer Buchpreis. She is also an Associate professor of Illustration at the Parsons School of Design in New York City.

Early life and education
Krug was born in 1977 in Karlsruhe, Germany. Growing up, she attended a specialized middle and high school for classical music but chose to pursue a career in drawing at the Liverpool Institute for Performing Arts. She returned to Europe briefly to study Visual Communication at Berlin University of the Arts but flew back to North America to earn her Master's of Fine Arts degree at the School of Visual Arts. 

While studying in New York, Krug said she began to feel ashamed of her home country because “as soon as you answer someone who asks you where you are from, the association with the Nazi period is there. You are constantly being confronted with it." Although she was confronted with negative stereotypes towards German cultural identity, she was simultaneously asked questions about her family history she had no knowledge of. Krug later recounted that she "felt a growing urge to tackle my country’s history in a new way. I realized that to overcome the collective, abstract shame I had grown into as a German two generations after the war, I needed to go back and ask questions about my family, my hometown." Upon marrying into a Jewish family, she began to properly research and record her family's story during World War II.

Career
As an Associate professor of Illustration at the Parsons School of Design, Krug received a 2013 Guggenheim Fellowship and 2014 Sendak Fellowship She also earned a gold medal from the Society of Illustrators  for her book Shadow Atlas, an Encyclopedia of Ghosts.

While approaching her late 30s, Krug returned to Germany to research archives and conduct interviews with her family members on their story during and prior to World War II. Krug said she was deeply disturbed to find Nazi propaganda in her uncle's grade school exercise books. Upon further investigation, she also found that her maternal grandfather Willi Rock was a driving instructor in Karlsruhe who became a member of the Nazi Party in 1933. Krug combined her knowledge and research into a graphic memoir titled Belonging: A German Reckons with History and Home (German title: Heimat). She later stated she illustrated and wrote her family story as a way to counteract the negative stereotypes she encountered in New York and educate the American public.

Krug's graphic novel (which, as a work of non-fiction, is not a "novel") received the 2018 National Book Critics Circle Award in Autobiography, 2019 Schubart-Literaturpreis, Evangelischer Buchpreis, Lynd Ward Graphic Novel Prize, Ludwig Marum Prize, Moira Gemmill Illustrator of the Year Award, and the British Book Design and Production Award for Graphic Novels.

References

1977 births
Living people
Alumni of the Liverpool Institute for Performing Arts
Berlin University of the Arts alumni
School of Visual Arts alumni
Parsons School of Design faculty
Artists from Karlsruhe
Writers from Karlsruhe